Climate engineering (also called geoengineering) is a term used for both carbon dioxide removal (CDR) and solar radiation management (SRM), also called solar geoengineering, when applied at a planetary scale. However, they have very different geophysical characteristics which is why the IPCC (Intergovernmental Panel on Climate Change) no longer uses this overarching term. Carbon dioxide removal approaches are part of climate change mitigation. Solar geoengineering involves reflecting some sunlight (solar radiation) back to space. All forms of geoengineering are not a standalone solution to climate change, but need to be coupled with other forms of climate change mitigation. Another approach to geoengineering is to increase the Earth's thermal emittance through passive radiative cooling.

Carbon dioxide removal (CDR) is defined as "Anthropogenic activities removing carbon dioxide (CO2) from the atmosphere and durably storing it in geological, terrestrial, or ocean reservoirs, or in products. It includes existing and potential anthropogenic enhancement of biological or geochemical CO2 sinks and direct air carbon dioxide capture and storage (DACCS), but excludes natural CO2 uptake not directly caused by human activities."

Some types of climate engineering are highly controversial due to the large uncertainties around effectiveness, side effects and unforeseen consequences. However, the risks of such interventions must be seen in the context of the trajectory of climate change without them.

Definitions 
Climate engineering (or geoengineering) has been used as an umbrella term for both CDR (carbon dioxide removal) and SRM (Solar radiation management or solar geoengineering), when applied at a planetary scale. However, these two methods have very different geophysical characteristics, which is why the Intergovernmental Panel on Climate Change (IPCC) no longer uses this term. This decision was communicated in around 2018, see for example the "Special Report on Global Warming of 1.5 °C". 

Some authors, for example in the mainstream media, also include passive daytime radiative cooling (PDRC), "ocean geoengineering" and others in the term of climate engineering.

Specific technologies that fall into the "climate engineering" umbrella term include:

 Carbon dioxide removal (CDR) 
 Biochar - Biochar is a high-carbon, fine-grained residue that is produced via pyrolysis
 Bioenergy with carbon capture and storage (BECCS) - the process of extracting bioenergy from biomass and capturing and storing the carbon, thereby removing it from the atmosphere.
 Enhanced weathering (EW) - a process that aims to accelerate the natural weathering by spreading finely ground silicate rock, such as basalt, onto surfaces which speeds up chemical reactions between rocks, water, and air. It also removes carbon dioxide from the atmosphere, permanently storing it in solid carbonate minerals or ocean alkalinity. The latter also slows ocean acidification.
 Solar Radiation Management (SRM)
 Marine cloud brightening (MCB) - a proposed technique that would make clouds brighter, reflecting a small fraction of incoming sunlight back into space in order to offset anthropogenic global warming.
 Mirrors in space (MIS) - satellites that are designed to change the amount of solar radiation that impacts the Earth as a form of climate engineering. Since the conception of the idea in 1923, 1929, 1957 and 1978 (Hermann Oberth) and also in the 1980s, space mirrors have mainly been theorized as a way to deflect sunlight to counter global warming and were seriously considered in the 2000s.
 Stratospheric aerosol injection (SAI) - a proposed method to introduce aerosols into the stratosphere to create a cooling effect via global dimming and increased albedo, which occurs naturally from volcanic eruptions.
The following methods are not termed "climate engineering" in the latest IPCC assessment report in 2022 but are nevertheless included in other publications on this topic:
 Passive daytime radiative cooling (PDRC) 
 Ocean geoengineering (many of the methods grouped as "ocean engineering" are actually simply carbon sequestration techniques and hence included in the carbon dioxide removal category)

Methods

Carbon dioxide removal

Solar geoengineering

Passive daytime radiative cooling 
Enhancing the thermal emissivity of Earth through passive daytime radiative cooling (PDRC) has been proposed as an alternative or "third approach" to geoengineering that is "less intrusive" and more predictable or reversible than stratospheric aerosol injection.

Ocean geoengineering 

Ocean geoengineering involves adding material such as lime or iron to the ocean to affect its ability to support marine life and/or sequester . In 2021 the US National Academies of Sciences, Engineering, and Medicine (NASEM) requested $2.5 billion funds for research in the following decade, specifically including field tests.

Ocean liming 

Enriching seawater with calcium hydroxide (lime) has been reported to lower ocean acidity, which reduces pressure on marine life such as oysters and absorb . The added lime raised the water's pH, capturing  in the form of calcium bicarbonate or as carbonate deposited in mollusk shells. Lime is produced in volume for the cement industry.

A 2014 experiment added sodium hydroxide (lye) to part of Australia's Great Barrier Reef. It raised pH levels to nearly preindustrial levels.

Alkaline additives become diluted and dispersed in one month, without durable effects, such that if necessary, the program could be ended without leaving long-term effects.

Iron fertilization

Submarine forest 
Another 2022 experiment attempted to sequester carbon using giant kelp planted off the Namibian coast. Whilst this approach has been called "ocean geoengineering" it is just another form of carbon dioxide removal via sequestration.

Issues

Vague meaning of the term 
According to climate economist Gernot Wagner the term "geoengineering" is  "largely an artefact and a result of the terms frequent use in popular discourse" and "so vague and all-encompassing as to have lost much meaning".

Moral hazard and ethics 
Climate engineering  may reduce the urgency of reducing carbon emissions, a form of moral hazard. However, several public opinion surveys and focus groups reported either desire to increase emission cuts in the presence of climate engineering, or of no effect. The Union of Concerned Scientists points to the danger that the technology will become an excuse not to address the root causes of climate change, slow our emissions reductions and start moving toward a low-carbon economy. Other modelling work suggests that the prospect of climate engineering may in fact increase the likelihood of emissions reduction.

If climate engineering can alter the climate then this raises questions whether humans have the right to deliberately change the climate, and under what conditions. For example, using climate engineering to stabilize temperatures is not the same as doing so to optimize the climate for some other purpose. Some religious traditions express views on the relationship between humans and their surroundings that encourage (to conduct responsible stewardship) or discourage (to avoid hubris) explicit actions to affect climate.

Opponents offer several objections: Climate engineering could reduce pressure for emissions reductions, which could exacerbate overall climate risks. Also, most efforts have only temporary effects, requiring ever-increasing interventions which imply rapid rebound if they are not sustained. Others assert that the threat of climate engineering could spur emissions cuts.

Hesitation
Some environmental organizations (such as Friends of the Earth and Greenpeace) have been reluctant to endorse or oppose solar geoengineering, but are often more supportive of nature-based carbon dioxide removal projects, such as afforestation and peatland restoration.

Interventions at large scale run a greater risk of unintended disruptions of natural systems, resulting in a dilemma that they such disruptions might be more damaging than the climate damage that they offset.

Public perception
A large 2018 study used an online survey to investigate public perceptions of six climate engineering methods in the United States, United Kingdom, Australia, and New Zealand. Public awareness of climate engineering was low; less than a fifth of respondents reported prior knowledge. Perceptions of the six climate engineering methods proposed (three from the carbon dioxide removal group and three from the solar geoengineering group) were largely negative and frequently associated with attributes like 'risky', 'artificial' and 'unknown effects'. Carbon dioxide removal methods were preferred over solar geoengineering. Public perceptions were remarkably stable with only minor differences between the different countries in the surveys.

History 
Several organizations have investigated climate engineering with a view to evaluating its potential, including the US Congress, the US National Academy of Sciences, Engineering, and Medicine, the Royal Society, the UK Parliament, the Institution of Mechanical Engineers, and the Intergovernmental Panel on Climate Change. The IMechE report examined a small subset of proposed methods (air capture, urban albedo and algal-based  capture techniques), and its main conclusions were that climate engineering should be researched and trialed at the small scale alongside a wider decarbonization of the economy.

The Royal Society review examined a wide range of proposed climate engineering methods and evaluated them in terms of effectiveness, affordability, timeliness, and safety (assigning qualitative estimates in each assessment). The key recommendations reports were that "Parties to the UNFCCC should make increased efforts towards mitigating and adapting to climate change, and in particular to agreeing to global emissions reductions", and that "[nothing] now known about geoengineering options gives any reason to diminish these efforts". Nonetheless, the report also recommended that "research and development of climate engineering options should be undertaken to investigate whether low-risk methods can be made available if it becomes necessary to reduce the rate of warming this century".

In 2009, a review examined the scientific plausibility of proposed methods rather than the practical considerations such as engineering feasibility or economic cost. The authors found that "[air] capture and storage shows the greatest potential, combined with afforestation, reforestation and bio-char production", and noted that "other suggestions that have received considerable media attention, in particular, "ocean pipes" appear to be ineffective". They concluded that "[climate] geoengineering is best considered as a potential complement to the mitigation of  emissions, rather than as an alternative to it".

In 2015, the US National Academy of Sciences, Engineering, and Medicine concluded a 21-month project to study the potential impacts, benefits, and costs of climate engineering. The differences between these two classes of climate engineering "led the committee to evaluate the two types of approaches separately in companion reports, a distinction it hopes carries over to future scientific and policy discussions." The resulting study titled Climate Intervention was released in February 2015 and consists of two volumes: Reflecting Sunlight to Cool Earth and Carbon Dioxide Removal and Reliable Sequestration. According to their brief about the study:Climate intervention is no substitute for reductions in carbon dioxide emissions and adaptation efforts aimed at reducing the negative consequences of climate change. However, as our planet enters a period of changing climate never before experienced in recorded human history, interest is growing in the potential for deliberate intervention in the climate system to counter climate change... Carbon dioxide removal strategies address a key driver of climate change, but research is needed to fully assess if any of these technologies could be appropriate for large-scale deployment. Albedo modification strategies could rapidly cool the planet's surface but pose environmental and other risks that are not well understood and therefore should not be deployed at climate-altering scales; more research is needed to determine if albedo modification approaches could be viable in the future.

See also
 
 Arctic geoengineering
 Climate justice
 Earth systems engineering and management
 Land surface effects on climate
 List of geoengineering topics
 Weather modification

References

 
Climate change policy
Emissions reduction
Engineering disciplines
Climate change
Planetary engineering